Boualem is a district in El Bayadh Province, Algeria. It was named after its capital, Boualem. It has the highest number of municipalities of any district in El Bayadh Province.

Municipalities
The district is further divided into 5 municipalities:
Boualem
Sidi Slimane
Stitten
Sidi Taifour
Sidi Ameur

Districts of El Bayadh Province